Sujith Fernando (date of birth unknown) is a Sri Lankan former first-class cricketer, active 1998–99, who played for Panadura Sports Club.. A left-handed batsman and a right-arm medium-pace bowler, he made a single first-class appearance for Panadura against Colombo scoring 8 runs in the first innings one in the second.

References

Sri Lankan cricketers
Panadura Sports Club cricketers
Living people
Year of birth missing (living people)